Cayancura, or Cayeucura, was a Mapuche leader native to the region of Marigüenu, chosen as toqui in 1584 to replace the captured Paineñamcu.  His one great operation was an attempted siege of the fort at Arauco that failed, leading to his abdication of his office in favor of his son Nangoniel in 1585.

References

External links
 Diego de Rosales, “Historia General del Reino de Chile”, Flandes Indiano, 3 tomos. Valparaíso 1877 - 1878.
  Historia general de el Reyno de Chile: Flandes Indiano Vol. 2 Capítulos LI, LII.
  Juan Ignatius Molina, The Geographical, Natural, and Civil History of Chili, Longman, Hurst, Rees, and Orme, London, 1809
  José Ignacio Víctor Eyzaguirre, Historia eclesiastica: Politica y literaria de Chile, IMPRENTA DEL COMERCIO, VALPARAISO, June 1830 List of Toquis, pg. 162-163

16th-century Mapuche people
Indigenous leaders of the Americas
People of the Arauco War
Toquis